Founded in 1967, the European Mortgage Federation (EMF) is the representative at EU level of the mortgage loan product, bringing together national banking associations and individual mortgage lenders from the EU Member States. The EMF is today recognised as the voice of the European mortgage industry on the retail side of the business in Europe and beyond. 

Through its work the Federation has become the key-talking partner of the European Commission, the European Parliament, the European Central Bank, the European System of Financial Supervisors and the Basel Committee on all questions relating to the European mortgage industry.

The Federation currently has 17 members across 14 Member States of the European Union as well as a number of observer members. The EMF provides data and information on European mortgage markets, which were worth over 7.0 trillion EUR at the end of 2015. The EMF secretariat is based in Brussels, Belgium.

Committees

The Federation has four main technical committees (Economic Affairs Committee, Legal Affairs Committee, Statistics Committee and Valuation Committee), which prepare its position papers and carry out its studies, and which report to the Executive Committee.

Publications

The EMF regularly publishes data, statistics, studies and a newsletter which provide information on developments, strategies and the latest trends related to the mortgage industry in Europe. The following are examples of some of the publications available:

Hypostat

The Federation's main source of statistical information with regards to recent developments in housing and mortgage markets in Europe. Hypostat is the result of a collaborative effort by the European Mortgage Federation’s national delegations and external experts.

The latest 2016 edition (published in September 2016) includes:
 35 European Countries - EU 28 plus Australia, Iceland, Japan, Norway, Russia, Turkey and the United States
 Country-by-country account of key economic, housing and mortgage market developments 
 Tables presenting key data on all aspects of housing finance from levels of mortgage debt outstanding to funding methods and macroeconomic indicators

Quarterly Reviews

EMF's Quarterly Reviews present the latest short-term developments in mortgage and housing markets in Europe. The reviews include tables, charts and comments on the following indicators: 
 Representative mortgage interest rates
 Total residential lending outstanding 
 Gross and net mortgage lending 
 Nominal house prices (% annual change)

Factsheets

The EMF Factsheets present indicators and trends of mortgage and housing markets in individual EU countries such as: 
 Owner occupation rate 
 Number of transactions 
 Total dwelling stock 
 House price percentage changes

EMF-ECBC Market Insights & Updates

EMF-ECBC Market Insights & Updates is the Federation's monthly newsletter, specifically designed for those who monitor developments at European level. This information service facilitates analysis of the impact of European affairs and initiatives in the area of mortgage lending. It reports on progress made in the main issues currently under discussion in Brussels.

The European Covered Bond Council 

The European Covered Bond Council (ECBC) is a European platform for covered bonds, which brings together covered bond issuers, credit analysts, investment bankers, rating agencies and other interested market participants. The ECBC was created by the European Mortgage Federation in 2004. The European Covered Bond Council focuses on the developments shaping the economic and regulatory environment of covered bonds at EU level and also globally. The goal is to enhance the visibility of covered bonds at European and global level. As of January 2016, the ECBC has over 100 members across over 30 active covered bond jurisdictions. ECBC members represent over 95% of covered bonds outstanding, which were worth nearly 2.5 trillion EUR at the end of 2015.

References

External links
 
 EMF website
 ECBC website
 ECBC Covered Bond Comparative Database

Mortgage
Pan-European trade and professional organizations